Miguel Ángel Toscano Velasco (born 17 November 1973) is a Mexican politician affiliated with the National Action Party. As of 2014 he served as Deputy of the LIX Legislature of the Mexican Congress representing the Federal District.

References

1973 births
Living people
Politicians from Mexico City
National Action Party (Mexico) politicians
Deputies of the LIX Legislature of Mexico
Members of the Chamber of Deputies (Mexico) for Mexico City